"Keep It in the Middle of the Road" is a song written by J.P. Pennington and Sonny LeMaire, and recorded by American country music group Exile.  It was released in December 1989 as the first single from the album Still Standing.  The song reached number 17 on the Billboard Hot Country Singles & Tracks chart.

Composition
The song is in the key of G major with a "bright country shuffle" beat. The main chord pattern is G79-C7-Cdim7-G-D7-D79-G.

Critical reception
An uncredited review in Billboard was positive, stating that "Hot guitar and piano licks strike like
lightning throughout this lively, tightly performed number."

Chart performance

References

1989 songs
1990 singles
Exile (American band) songs
Songs written by J.P. Pennington
Arista Nashville singles
Songs written by Sonny LeMaire